Olivier Mével (born April 27, 1967) is a French Internet of Things pioneer. An engineer by training, he is a serial entrepreneur and businessman with an interest in building interactive web-connected objects. Mével is the co-inventor of Nabaztag, a Wi-Fi enabled ambient electronic device in the shape of a rabbit.

In 2012, Mével was named one of 100 French digital influencers and, in 2014, one of 20 French personalities that made an impact on the Internet of Things.

Career 
Mével graduated from the École Nationale Supérieure de Techniques Avancées (ENSTA ParisTech) in 1990. In 1995, he co-founded BaBeL@STaL, one of the first French digital agencies, with Philippe Feinsilber.

In 2000, he was a member of the Kasskooye.com team, a then popular French website that parodied the new economy, under the pseudonym of Igmar Andersen.

In 2003, he co-founded Violet with Rafi Haladjian, which created Nabaztag, an interactive and internet-connected object launched in 2005 and the RFID reader Mir:ror. He's listed as inventor on 2 patents related to ambient and connected devices.

In 2009, he co-founded reaDIYmate with Marc Chareyron . The reaDIYmate DIY kits were successfully launched and manufactured in 2012 on Kickstarter. The duo also created TeleSound   which, on its preliminary campaign, did not gather sufficient funds for full-scale manufacturing   and is awaiting future re-launch.

The Mével/ Chareyron collaboration produced Enero; a design & technology consultancy focusing on the Internet of Things.

Mével is a mentor for the hardware accelerator program Haxlr8r and a co-organizer of the Internet of Things Paris Meetups (#iotparis).

References

Living people
French businesspeople
1967 births